The Great Divide Basin or Great Divide Closed Basin is an area of land in the Red Desert of Wyoming where none of the water falling as rain to the ground drains into any ocean, directly or indirectly. It is thus an endorheic basin, one of several in the United States that adjoin the Continental Divide. To the south and west of the basin is the Green River watershed, draining to the Gulf of California/Pacific Ocean; to the north and east is the North Platte watershed, draining to the Gulf of Mexico/Atlantic Ocean.

History
Although the Great Divide Basin provides a relatively low and easy crossing of the Continental Divide, its aridity and endorheic nature were an obstacle to pioneers during the westward expansion of the United States; it was known as the Saline Plain around the 1870s. Consequently, the Oregon Trail detoured north over South Pass, and the Overland Trail detoured south over Bridger Pass. In contrast, during the construction of the first transcontinental railroad, the Union Pacific was laid directly across the southern part of the basin. (The original railroad map labelled one point along this route as Bridgers Pass, giving rise to the still-common misconception that the railroad followed the Overland Trail.) Roughly the same route across the basin was later taken by the transcontinental highways traversing the region, namely the Lincoln Highway, U.S. 30, and Interstate 80. The basin is also traversed in a north-south direction by U.S. 287 and Wyoming 789. Even today the basin is very sparsely populated, the only incorporated town being Wamsutter, with a population of 451 at the 2010 census.

A highway sign marks this as a crossing of the Continental Divide, although that is a matter of interpretation. While this is no longer recognized as a crossing of the Divide, it was evidently considered to be just that during the days of the Lincoln Highway and U.S. 30, and a monument to Henry B. Joy, the first president of the Lincoln Highway Association, was placed just south of this point along the old highway. (It was relocated to Sherman Summit in 2001 to protect it from increasing vandalism.) (The placement of the Divide on the west rim of the basin signifies that this otherwise endorheic region would drain to the east if it were to overflow.)

Geology

The Great Divide Basin is part of the Greater Green River Basin, separated from the Green River Basin by the Rock Springs Uplift during Late Cretaceous into the Early Eocene.

Geography
While usually thought of as a single basin, the Great Divide Basin is actually several contiguous sub-basins, most notably those centered on Circle Bar Lake, Frewen Lake, Lost Creek Lake, Red Lake, and Separation Lake. The interior ridges separating these sub-basins have led to disagreement about the correct path of the Continental Divide across or around the basin.

The Lucite Hills form part of the western boundary of the basin, featuring Black Rock Butte and Emmons Cone. Alkali Flat and Greasewood Flat are directly to their northeast. Sand dunes lie in the central western part of the basin. In the southern part of the western basin, Red Desert Flat and Red Desert Basin are the major features. In the northeast part of the Great Divide Basin is Chain Lakes Flat, southwest and downslope from Bairoil and Lamont.

The basin is a high desert dominated by sand dunes, bluffs and alkali flats. Flora and fauna include small trees in some ravines and the occasional shrub, along with many birds and pronghorn, mule deer, feral horses, and a desert elk herd. The basin includes uranium ore deposits and many oil and natural gas wells. There has been debate between those who wish to exploit the resources within the basin and those who wish to see at least parts of it officially designated as wilderness.

In popular culture
The British author Arthur Conan Doyle described a romanticized version of the Great Divide Basin, which the novel called the Great Alkali Plain, in his Sherlock Holmes work A Study in Scarlet (1887).

References

External links
Map
Landscape features (NASA, 2002)

Landforms of Carbon County, Wyoming
Landforms of Fremont County, Wyoming
Landforms of Sweetwater County, Wyoming
Endorheic basins of the United States
Great Divide of North America
Drainage basins of North America